Ardıçlı is a village in Tarsus district of Mersin Province, Turkey. The population of the village was 433  as of 2012.

References

Villages in Tarsus District